Dénia is a historical coastal city in the province of Alicante, Spain, on the Costa Blanca halfway between Alicante and Valencia, and the capital and judicial seat of the comarca of Marina Alta. Denia's historical heritage has been influenced by Iberian, Greek, Roman, Islamic, Napoleonic and Christian civilizations. , it had a population of 43,819, although this is more than doubled by tourism during the summer months.

History
There is evidence of human habitation in the area since prehistoric times and there are significant Iberian ruins on the hillsides nearby. In the 4th century BC it was a Greek colony of Marseille or Empúries, perhaps the one mentioned by Strabo as Hēmeroskopeion (meaning "watchtower"). It was an ally of Rome during the Punic Wars, and later was absorbed into the Roman Empire under the name of Dianium (after their goddess Diana). In the 1st century BC Quintus Sertorius established a Roman naval base here.

In 636-696 AD, during the Visigothic Kingdom of Iberia, it was the seat of a bishop from Toledo. The Slavic Muslim slaves, saqālibah, led by Mujahid ibn Yusuf ibn Ali their leader, who could take profit from the progressive crumbling of the Caliphate's superstructure to gain control over the province of Dénia. The Saqaliba managed to free themselves and run the Taifa of Dénia which extended its reach as far as the islands of Majorca and its capital . The Saqaliba Taifa lost its independence in 1076, when it was captured by Ahmad al-Muqtadir, lord of Zaragoza, under which it remained until the Almoravid invasion in 1091. The Muslim Arabs originally built the castle fortress, and the French, who occupied the city for four years during the Peninsular War, re-built it in the early 19th century.

 
The town was reconquered by the Christians in 1244. This caused a decline for the city, which remained nearly uninhabited after the exile of most of the Muslim population. It was later repopulated by the Valencian government. Created a fief in 1298, it was held by the de Sandoval family from 1431, although the city itself was returned to Aragonese crown in 1455. A marquisate from 1487, Dénia gained many privileges thanks to Francisco Gómez de Sandoval y Rojas, Duke of Lerma, a favourite of Philip III of Spain. It suffered a further period of decay after the decree of Expulsion of the Moriscos (1609), by which 25,000 people left the marquisate, leaving the local economy in a dismal state.

During the War of the Spanish Succession Dénia was besieged by 9,000 French troops in June 1707, who broke down several sections of the town walls using cannon, but their attacks in July were repulsed by the small garrison with great loss of life to the attackers resulting in the siege being raised after 27 days. Dénia, however, fell to the French forces that November. In 1713 the Treaty of Utrecht recognised Louis XIV's grandson Philip, Duke of Anjou, as King of Spain (as Philip V), so returning Dénia to Spanish rule.

It was reacquired by the Spanish crown in 1803, after which Denia gained an increasingly important role as a trading port. A community of English raisin traders lived in Denia from 1800 until the time of the Spanish Civil War in the late 1930s.

Main sights
Dénia is home to a large Moorish castle named Castle of Dénia on a rocky crag overlooking the city. It was built in the 11th and 12th century and offers views around the sea, the city and the surrounding area. Located in the castle is the Palau del Governador and its corresponding museum.

Dénia also has the Museu Etnològic with further details on the history and culture of the city.

 Route of the Valencian classics

Climate
Dénia has a Mediterranean climate (Köppen Csa), with mild winters and hot summers. Summer is the driest season, but not rainless, as on average, it receives around  although July is almost rainless as on average it receives under  of rain, being the sunniest month as well. Storms are common in Autumn, averaging about 15 stormy days per year. The city enjoys around 2750 sunshine hours per year.

Transportation

The ferry to Ibiza and the other Balearic Islands departs daily. The city also serves as the northern terminus for a  railway line through the mountains from Alicante (popularly known as the Limón Express), run by FGV. This is not a specific tourist railway; it provides transport throughout the year and is geared to commuter use.

Culture

The bonfire festival is celebrated each March.  Huge papier-mâché statues called fallas are set up throughout the town, and then set ablaze.

The Bous a la Mar (meaning "Bulls at the Sea") is held in July. The highlight of this week-long festival is watching bulls run down the main street Marqués de Campo, only to be chased into the Mediterranean sea by those daring enough to enter a makeshift bull ring with them.

Since 1974 it has been home to painter and sculptor Joan Castejón. The town honored him as an Adoptive Son of Dénia in 1999.

Since 2015 Dénia has been an UNESCO Creative City of Gastronomy. The celebrity Chef Quique Dacosta has a 3 star Michelin restaurant in the Las Marinas area of the city.

Notable people
Abu al-Salt, Andalusian polymath
 Joan Castejón, sculptor
 Marta García, a racing driver who competes in the W Series
 Alberto Sols García, biochemist

Sports
Dénia's local football team is called Club Deportivo Dénia, and plays in Spain's Third Division.

Twin towns
 Cholet, France

See also
Taifa of Dénia

Notes

References

External links 
 Festivals

Municipalities in the Province of Alicante
Tourism in Spain
Mediterranean port cities and towns in Spain
Greek colonies in Iberia
Ancient Greek archaeological sites in Spain